The fat-nosed spiny rat (Maxomys inflatus) is a species of rodent in the family Muridae.
It is found only in Indonesia.

References
 Baillie, J. 1996.  Maxomys inflatus.   2006 IUCN Red List of Threatened Species.   Downloaded on 19 July 2007.

Maxomys
Mammals described in 1916
Taxonomy articles created by Polbot
Endemic fauna of Indonesia
Rodents of Indonesia